Usha Verma is an Indian politician. She was elected to the Lok Sabha, the lower house of the Parliament of India from Hardoi, Uttar Pradesh in 1998, 2004 and 2009 as a member of the Samajwadi Party as a SC candidate. She was elected to the Uttar Pradesh Legislative Assembly in 2002 and became a Minister in the Mulayam Singh Yadav ministry in 2003. She was the daughter in law of late member of parliament Parmai Lal, who is famous for winning his first election in 1962 while he was in prison.

Early life and education 
Usha Verma was born on 5 May 1963 in Haridwar, Uttrakhand to Basant Kumar and Usha Verma. She completed her master's degree in English from S.D. Degree College and B.S.M. Degree College, Roorkee, Uttar Pradesh.

Later she was married to Lal Bihari on 29 January 1988 and had a son and a daughter in a few years.

Personal interests 
She was interested in social work. She was even a member of joint committee of empowerment of women in 1999, then a member of committee on welfare of Scheduled Castes and Scheduled Tribes in 2004 and also was a member of Committee of Social Justice and Empowerment from 2004 to 2009.

She loves to sing, cook as well as paint. She also works for the upliftment of the downtrodden, the poor children and women; and works for an ideal society which may satisfy the basic needs of the people. By profession she also works an agriculturist, architect, political and social worker as well as a business person.

Positions held

References

External links
 Official biographical sketch in Parliament of India website

1963 births
Women in Uttar Pradesh politics
Living people
People from Haridwar
People from Hardoi
Samajwadi Party politicians
Lok Sabha members from Uttar Pradesh
People from Lakhimpur Kheri
India MPs 1998–1999
India MPs 2004–2009
India MPs 2009–2014
20th-century Indian women politicians
20th-century Indian politicians
21st-century Indian women politicians
21st-century Indian politicians
Samajwadi Party politicians from Uttar Pradesh